Evergreen Plantation may refer to:

Evergreen Plantation (Grenada, Mississippi), listed on the NRHPs in Mississippi (Grenada County)
Evergreen Plantation (Wallace, Louisiana), listed on the NRHP in Louisiana
Evergreen Plantation in Brazoria County, Texas; belonged to Alexander Calvit and was later known as Herndon Plantation.
Evergreen Plantation in Prince George County, Virginia, birthplace of Edmund Ruffin.

Evergreen (Haymarket, Virginia) NRHP in Prince William County, Virginia